Jauravia simplex, is a species of lady beetle native to India, and Sri Lanka.

Description
Body length is about 2.2 to 2.5 mm. Body sub-hemispherical. Dorsum light brown. External border of elytra is much lighter. Ventrum bright yellowish brown. Metasternum is much darker. Head very finely, closely punctate. The pubescence with short yellowish-white hairs. Pronotum moderately and regularly emargihate anteriorly. Elytral punctures are fine, and close with yellowish white, short and moderately dense pubescence. Elytral punctation is fine and close. Elytral interspaces are strongly corriaceous. Ventrum finely, and sparsely punctate with delicate, short and sparse pubescence.

It is a predator of Cecidomyiid larvae that attack coffee.

References 

Coccinellidae
Insects of Sri Lanka
Beetles described in 1859